Dingeleh Kahriz (also Romanized as Dīngeleh Kahrīz and Dīngleh Kahrīz; also known as Dengeleh Kahrīz) is a village in Sangestan Rural District, in the Central District of Hamadan County, Hamadan Province, Iran. At the 2006 census, its population was 460, in 121 families.

References 

Populated places in Hamadan County